Thai numerals are a set of numerals traditionally used in Thailand, although the Arabic numerals are more common due to extensive westernization of Thailand in the modern Rattanakosin period. Thai numerals follow the Hindu–Arabic numeral system commonly used in the rest of the world. In Thai language, numerals often follow the modified noun and precede a measure word, although variations to this pattern occur.

Usage
The Thai language lacks grammatical number. A count is usually expressed in the form of an uninflected noun followed by a number and a classifier.  "Five teachers" is expressed as "teacher five person"  ( or with the numeral included .)  "person" is a type of referent noun that is also used as the Thai part of speech called in English a linguistic classifier, or measure word. In Thai, counting is kannap (nap is "to count", kan is a prefix that forms a noun from a verb); the classifier, laksananam ( from laksana characteristic, form, attribute, quality, pattern, style; and nam name, designation, appellation.) Variations to this pattern do occur, and there really is no hierarchy among Thai classifiers.
A partial list of Thai words that also classify nouns can be found in Wiktionary category:  Thai classifiers.

Main numbers

Zero to ten
Thai sūn is written as oval 0 (number) when using Arabic numerals, but a small circle  when using traditional numerals, and also means centre in other contexts. It is from Sanskrit śūnya, as are the (context-driven) alternate names for numbers one to four given below; but not the counting 1 (number). 

Thai names for N +1 and the regular digits 2 through 9 as shown in the table, below, resemble those in Chinese varieties (e.g., Cantonese and Min Nan) as spoken in Southern China, the homeland of the overseas chinese living in South East Asia. In fact, the etymology of Thai numerals 2, 3, 4, 6, 7, 8, 9, and 10 is Middle Chinese, while the etymology of Thai numeral 5 is Old Chinese, as illustrated in the table below

Numerical digit characters, however, are almost identical to Khmer numerals. Thai and Lao words for numerals are almost identical, however, the numerical digits vary somewhat in shape. Shown above is a comparison between three languages using Cantonese and Minnan characters and pronunciations. Shown below is a comparison between three languages using Khmer numerals. Thai and Lao. The Thai transliteration uses the Royal Thai General System of Transcription (RTGS).

Ten to a million
Sanskrit lakh designates the place value of a digit (tamnaeng khong tua lek, ตําแหน่งของตัวเลข), which are named for the powers of ten: the unit's place is lak nuai (หลักหน่วย); ten's place, lak sip (หลักสิบ); hundred's place, lak roi (หลักร้อย), and so forth.  The number one following any multiple of sip becomes et (Cantonese: 一, yat1; Minnan: 一, it4). The number ten (sip) is the same as Minnan 十 (sip8, lit.). Numbers from twenty to twenty nine begin with yi sip (Cantonese: 二十, yi6sap6; Minnan: 二十, lit. ji7sip8). Names of the lak sip for 30 to 90, and for the lak of 100, 1000, 10,000, 100,000 and million, are almost identical to those of the like Khmer numerals. 

For the numbers twenty-one through twenty-nine, the part signifying twenty: yi sip (ยี่สิบ), may be colloquially shortened to yip (ยีบ). See the alternate numbers section below.

The hundreds are formed by combining roi with the tens and ones values. For example, two hundred and thirty-two is song roi sam sip song. The words roi, phan, muen, and saen should occur with a preceding numeral (nueng is optional), so two hundred ten, for example, is song roi sip, and one hundred is either roi or nueng roi. Nueng never precedes sip, so song roi nueng sip is incorrect. Native speakers will sometimes use roi nueng (or phan nueng, etc.) with different tones on nueng to distinguish one hundred from one hundred and one. However, such distinction is often not made, and ambiguity may follow. To resolve this problem, if the number 101 (or 1001, 10001, etc.) is intended, one should say roi et (or phan et, muen et, etc.).

Numbers above a million
Numbers above a million are constructed by prefixing lan with a multiplier. For example, ten million is sip lan, and a trillion (1012, a long scale billion) is lan lan.

Decimal and fractional numbers
Colloquially, decimal numbers are formed by saying chut (จุด, dot) where the decimal separator is located. For example, 1.01 is nueng chut sun nueng (หนึ่งจุดศูนย์หนึ่ง).

Fractional numbers are formed by placing nai (ใน, in, of) between the numerator and denominator or using [set] x suan y ([เศษ] x ส่วน y, x parts of the whole y) to clearly indicate. For example,  is nueng nai sam (หนึ่งในสาม) or [set] nueng suan sam ([เศษ]หนึ่งส่วนสาม). The word set (เศษ) can be omitted.

The word khrueng (ครึ่ง) is used for "half". It precedes the measure word if used alone, but it follows the measure word when used with another number. For example, kradat khrueng phaen (กระดาษครึ่งแผ่น) means "half sheet of paper", but kradat nueng phaen khrueng (กระดาษหนึ่งแผ่นครึ่ง) means "one and a half sheets of paper".

Negative numbers
Negative numbers are formed by placing lop (ลบ, minus) in front of the number. For example, −11 is lop sip et (ลบสิบเอ็ด).

Ordinal numbers
Ordinal numbers are formed by placing thi (ที่, place) in front of the number. They are not considered a special class of numbers, since the numeral still follows a modified noun, which is thi in this case.

Alternative numbers

Ai
Ai is used for "first born (son)" or for the first month, duean ai (เดือนอ้าย), of the Thai lunar calendar.

Ek 
Ek is from Pali ḗka, "one"  Ek is used for one (quantity); first (rank), more prominent than tho โท second, in tone marks, education degrees and military ranks; and for the lead actor in a role. In antiquity, a seventh daughter was called luk ek (ลูกเอก), though a seventh son was luk chet (ลูกเจ็ด).

Et
Et (Cantonese: 一, jat1; Minnan: 一, it4), meaning "one", is used as last member in a compound number (see the main numbers section above).

Tho 
Tho is from Pali dūā, "two". Tho is used for two and for the second-level rank in tone marks, education degrees and military ranks.

Yi
Yi (Cantonese: 二, ji6; Minnan: 二, ji7) is still used in several places in Thai language for the number two, apart from song (สอง): to construct twenty (two tens) and its combinations twenty-one through twenty-nine; to name the second month, duean yi (เดือนยี่), of the traditional Thai lunar calendar; and in the Thai northern dialect thin pha yap (ถิ่นพายัพ), in which it refers to the Year of the Tiger.

Tri & Trai
Tri and trai are from Sanskrit trāyaḥ, "three". These alternatives are used for three; third rank in tone marks, education degrees and military ranks; and as a prefix meaning three(fold).

Chattawa
Chattawa is the Pali numeral four; used for the fourth tone mark and as a prefix meaning fourth in order or quadruple in number.

Lo
Lo means a dozen or twelve. It is usually used for trade. It may also mean jar or  bottle.

Yip
Yip in colloquial Thai is an elision or contraction of yi sip (ยี่สิบ) at the beginning of numbers twenty-one through twenty-nine. Therefore, one may hear yip et (ยีบเอ็ด, ยิบเอ็ด), yip song (ยีบสอง, ยิบสอง), up to yip kao (ยีบเก้า, ยิบเก้า). Yip may have a long vowel (ยีบ) or be elided further into a short vowel (ยิบ).

Sao
Sao is twenty in the Thai northern dialect and in the Isan language. It is related to xao (ຊາວ), the word for twenty in the Lao language.

Kurut
Kurut means a dozen dozen or 144. It is usually used for trade. It is a loanword from gross.

Kot
Kot is ten million used in religious context. It comes from Pali/Sanskrit kōṭi. See also crore.

Tone marks, education degrees and military ranks 
The alternate set of numerals used to name tonal marks (ไม้, mai), educational degrees (ปริญญา, parinya), and military rankings derive from names of Sanskrit numerals.

See also 
 Chinese numerals
 Indian numbering system
 Indian numerals
 Khmer numerals
 Lakh
 Thai alphabet
 Thai language
 Thai six-hour clock
 The Royal Institute of Thailand

References

External links
 Thai Royal Institute On-line Dictionary (ORID 1999) [TH:  พจนานุกรม ฉบับราชบัณฑิตยสถาน พ.ศ. ๒๕๔๒]
 Numerals in many different writing systems, which includes Lao, Khmer and Thai numerals 0-9; retrieved 2008-11-12
 Graphic version of Numerals in many different writing systems, no Unicode required; retrieved 2008-11-12
 Thai Numbers. How they are written in their numeral and textual forms and how to pronounce them.
Search result for numerative noun (11 entries)
"International Reference Library Thread of Thai Classifiers" (38 entries)

Thai culture
Thai language
Numerals